is a Latin word, used by the Romans as a salutation and greeting, meaning 'hail'. It is the singular imperative form of the verb , which meant 'to be well'; thus one could translate it literally as 'be well' or 'farewell'.

Etymology 

Indeed, its long vowel also ended up short via iambic shortening; this would explain the reluctance to spell the aspirate, as well as its interpretation as a verb form. 

The word has been attested since Plautus.

Use 

As far back as the first century AD, the greeting in popular use had the form  (pronounced  or perhaps ), with the aspirated initial syllable and the second syllable shortened, for which the most explicit description has been given by Quintilian in his . While  would be informal in part because it has the non-etymological aspiration, centuries later, any and all aspiration would instead completely disappear from popular speech, becoming an artificial and learned feature.

The term was notably used to greet the Caesar or other authorities. Suetonius recorded that on one occasion, naumachiarii—captives and criminals fated to die fighting during mock naval encounters—addressed Claudius Caesar with the words "" ('Hail, Caesar! Those who are about to die salute you!') in an attempt to avoid death. The expression is not recorded as being used in Roman times on any other occasion.

The Vulgate version of the Annunciation translates the salute of the angel to Mary, Mother of Jesus as "" ('Hail, full of grace'). The phrase "Hail Mary" is a Catholic Marian prayer that has inspired authors of religious music.

Fascist regimes during the 20th century also adopted the greeting. It was also distinctly used during the National Socialist Third Reich in the indirect German translation, .

See also 

 Ave Imperator, morituri te salutant
 Bellamy salute
 Bras d'honneur
 Heil og sæl
 Quenelle (gesture) 
 Raised fist
 Roman salute
 Zogist salute

References 

Latin words and phrases
Greeting words and phrases